The A7 Autoroute, also known as l'autoroute du Soleil (English: the Motorway of the Sun) is a French motorway. It continues the A6 and links Lyon to Marseille.

History
The part of the road in Marseille was built by the Nazi invaders in 1941.

Sorties (Exits)

  A7-A6 Junction
  01 1.8 km: Lyon-centre
  02 2.3 km: Lyon-centre
  03 4 km: Oullins
  04 5.5 km: Pierre-Bénite
  05 5.5 km: St.-Fons (vers le Boulevard Périphérique, via le Boulevard Pierre-Sémard)
  06 9.1 km: Vénissieux
  Aire de Solaize
  07 13.5 km: Solaize
  07a 14 km: Sérézin-du-Rhône
  Aire de Sérézin-du-Rhône (southbound)
  A7-A46-A47 Junction
  08 21.5 km: chasse-sur-Rhône (de Marseille)
  09 26 km: Vienne, Valence par N7, Grenoble par RN (de Lyon)
  10 32 km: Vienne, L'Isle d'Abeau (de Marseille)
  Péage de Vienne
  Aires de repos : Auberives (northbound) Grande Borne (Southbound)

  Aire de SRoussilon (northbound Petrol only)
  12 33 km: Chanas Annonay / N82
  Aire de St Rambert d'Albon
  Aires de repos : Blacheronde (northbound) Combe Tourmente (southbound)
  Aires de repos : Bornaron/La Galaure
  Aires de repos : Bouterne (southbound)
  13 : Tain l'Hermittage Romans
  Aire de Pont de l'Isere/Latitude 45'
  14: Valence nord
  15: Gap Valence vers A49 / N532
  Aire de Portes les Valence
  Aires de repos : Bellevue/Livron
  16: Loriol-sur-Drôme Crest Privas
  Aire de Bras de Zil (AR)/Saulce
  17: Montélimar Le Teil Dieulefit
  Aire de Montélimar
  Aires de repos : Coucourde/Le logis neuf
  Aires de repos : Savasse/Roubion
  18: Montélimar Aubenas Le Puy-en-Velay
  Aires de repos : Donzere (southbound) Pierrelate (northbound)
  Aires de repos : Tricastin (southbound)
  19: Bollène Alès
  Aire de Mornas les Adrets (southbound) Mornas village (northbound)
  A7-A9 Junction
  21 167 km: Orange
  Aires de repos : Orange le Gres/Orange le Coudoulet
  Aires de repos : Le Fournalet (northbound)
  22 172 km: Orange sud Carpentras
  Aire de Sorgues (southbound)
 Aire de Repos: Le Fournalet (northbound)
  23 188 km: Avignon nord Carpentras
  Aire de Morieres (northbound)
  24 198 km: Avignon sud, Apt
  Aires de repos : Noves (southbound) Cabannes (northbound)
  Aires de repos : Cavaillon
 *  25 211 km: Cavaillon Arles Beaucaire et Tarascon
  Aires de repos : Sénas
  26 221 km: Sénas
  Aires de repos : Lamanon (southbound)
  27 229 km: Rognac, Avignon et Lyon par RN
  A7-A54 Junction
  Péage de Lançon Provence
  Aires de repos :
  A7-A8 Junction
  29 254 km: Rognac Berre
  Aire de Vitrolles
  30 : Vitrolles
  29: Aéroport Marignane
  30: Les Pennes-Mirabeau (de Marseille)
  A7-A55 Junction
  31: Les Pennes-Mirabeau (de Lyon)
  A7-A51 Junction
  32: St Antoine (N8)
  33: Les Aygalades
  34: Les Arnavaux
  A7-A507 Junction
  35: La Rose, Aubagne, Toulon par RN
  36: A557 liaison vers A55, Bd.-Plombière (depuis Lyon)
  37: Saint Charles
 Terminus at Porte d'Aix

Péages (Tolls)
Péage de Vienne
Péage de Lançon de Provence

Traffic
This autoroute is fairly heavy throughout the year. Much of the transit of heavy goods between northern France and the Benelux countries and Germany and the Mediterranean passes through the Rhône valley, and thus along the A7. Traffic is also generated by local transit around the larger cities of the region (Lyon, Vienne, Valence, Orange, Avignon). During holiday periods, traffic is particularly congested, southbound at the beginning of holidays, northbound at the end. The last week-end of July and the first week-end of August are particularly crowded in both directions; jams can occasionally stretch for hundreds of kilometers.

Future
The section of the motorway going through Lyon between La Mulatière and Perrache train station are in the process of being declassified, with the intent of turning this section into an urban boulevard. To compensate, a new motorway, the A44 will be built bypassing Lyon and connecting to the A7.

References

A07